The Best Cooking Secrets is a South Korean cooking show that premiered on 2 October 2000 on EBS 1TV and airs from Monday to Friday at 10:50AM KST. It is the longest-running cooking program in South Korea. The program is hosted by Kim Dong-wan.

Format
The Best Cooking Secrets format focuses on food preparations and giving instructions to the viewers on the best way to cook everyday meals. A different guest made up of chefs and celebrities will attend the show every week and demonstrate on how to make different dishes in every episodes. At the end of an episode, the host will taste the dish and give their opinions.

The cooking show airs for around 30 minutes from Monday to Friday at 10:50AM KST. A compilation of the week's episode airs on Saturday at 11:00AM KST.

Hosts
The show had had twelve hosts since its inceptions:
Kim Hye-young (20002002)
Hwang Hyun-jung (20022004)
Im Ho (2004)
Jung Ae-ri (20042005)
Jeong Ji-yeong (20052006)
Kim Ji-ho (20062007)
Myung Se-bin (20072008)
Park Soo-hong (20082012)
Yoon Hyung-bin (20122015)
Hwang Kwanghee (20152017, since 2022)
Leeteuk (20172020)
Kim Dong-wan (20202022)

Episodes
The Best Cooking Secrets first aired on 2 October 2000. As of March 2015, 2830 episodes were aired.

References

South Korean cooking television series
2000s cooking television series
Korean-language television shows
2000 South Korean television series debuts